Opava District is a district (okres) within Moravian-Silesian Region of the Czech Republic. Its capital is the city of Opava.

Complete list of municipalities
Bělá - 
Bohuslavice - 
Bolatice - 
Branka u Opavy - 
Bratříkovice - 
Březová - 
Brumovice - 
Budišov nad Budišovkou - 
Budišovice -  
Čermná ve Slezsku - 
Chlebičov -
Chuchelná - 
Chvalíkovice -
Darkovice - 
Děhylov - 
Dobroslavice - 
Dolní Benešov - 
Dolní Životice - 
Háj ve Slezsku - 
Hať - 
Hlavnice - 
Hlubočec - 
Hlučín - 
Hněvošice - 
Holasovice -  
Hrabyně - 
Hradec nad Moravicí - 
Jakartovice - 
Jezdkovice - 
Kobeřice - 
Kozmice - 
Kravaře - 
Kružberk - 
Kyjovice - 
Lhotka u Litultovic - 
Litultovice -
Ludgeřovice - 
Markvartovice - 
Melč - 
Mikolajice - 
Mladecko - 
Mokré Lazce - 
Moravice - 
Neplachovice - 
Nové Lublice - 
Nové Sedlice - 
Oldřišov - 
Opava - 
Otice -
Píšť - 
Pustá Polom - 
Radkov - 
Raduň -
Rohov -
Šilheřovice - 
Skřipov - 
Slavkov - 
Služovice - 
Sosnová -
Štáblovice - 
Staré Těchanovice - 
Stěbořice - 
Štěpánkovice - 
Štítina -
Strahovice - 
Sudice - 
Svatoňovice - 
Těškovice -
Třebom - 
Uhlířov -  
Velké Heraltice - 
Velké Hoštice - 
Větřkovice - 
Vítkov - 
Vřesina -
Vršovice - 
Závada

See also
Silesia Euroregion

References

 
Districts of the Czech Republic